Guillermo Fischer (born 18 July 1996) is an Argentine handball player who plays for SD Teucro and the Argentine national team.

He represented Argentina at the 2019 World Men's Handball Championship.

References

1996 births
Living people
Argentine male handball players
Expatriate handball players
Argentine expatriate sportspeople in Spain
Liga ASOBAL players
Handball players at the 2019 Pan American Games
Pan American Games medalists in handball
Pan American Games gold medalists for Argentina
Medalists at the 2019 Pan American Games
21st-century Argentine people